Matsyagandha Lake (मत्स्यगंधा) is an artificial lake in the Sattar Kataiya block of Saharsa district of Northern Bihar region in India. It is approximately 1.50 km long and 200 m wide, and its water-retention capacity is planned to be increased to 6000 m3. It was conceptualized in 1996 by the then Saharsa Collector, Tej Narayan Lal Das, out of a wasteland where dead bodies used to be cremated.

As a result of neglect, the lake shrunk greatly between 2006 and 2017, almost disappearing by 2018. As of June 2020, the lake has been planned to be renovated at the cost of ₹ 7.47 Crore (USD 1.02 M), under the Jal-Jeevan-Hariyali mission of the Government of Bihar. The plan, to be carried out by the State Department of Minor Water Resources, includes increasing the depth profile by 2 meters and expanding the size of the lake to 81 acres.

Etymology 
The name of the lake is derived from the semi-mythical character of Matsyagandha, the wife of King Shantanu. She is also the mother of the sage Vyas, fathered by the wandering rishi (sage) Parashara.

Facilities 
There is a Matsyagandha temple nearby, which houses a small temple pond with the idols of Gods and Goddesses. The lake also has the facility for boating and speed-boating at a chargeable basis. However, due to low water levels, the boating facility is intermittent. There are plans for lake beautification by developing a 8 feet wide paver block, lined with lush trees and park benches for tourism spot.

References 

Lakes of India
Landforms of Bihar